Brighton Township may refer to:

 Brighton Township, Macoupin County, Illinois
 Brighton Township, Washington County, Iowa
 Brighton Township, Michigan
 Brighton Township, Nicollet County, Minnesota
 Brighton Township, Lorain County, Ohio
 Brighton Township, Beaver County, Pennsylvania

Township name disambiguation pages